The 2015 Stockport Metropolitan Borough Council election took place on 7 May 2015 to elect members of Stockport Metropolitan Borough Council in England. This was on the same day as other local elections and the UK General Election. Stockport Council is elected in thirds which means that in each three member local ward, one councillor is elected every year, except every four years which is classed as fallow year. The last fallow year was 2013, when no local government elections took place in the borough. Those councillors elected with serve a four-year term expiring in 2019.

Following the elections, the Lib Dem minority administration was able to continue in office.

Election results by ward 
Asterix indicates incumbent in the Ward, and Bold names highlight winning candidate.

Bramhall North

Bramhall South & Woodford 
Paul Bellis was previously the Conservative Party councillor for Bramhall South & Woodford.

Bredbury & Woodley

Bredbury Green & Romiley

Brinnington & Central

Cheadle & Gatley

Cheadle Hulme North

Chealde Hulme South

Davenport & Cale Green

Edgeley & Cheadle Heath

Hazel Grove 
William Wragg was the incumbent however he instead contested the Hazel Grove Constituency for the Conservative Party.

Heald Green

Heatons North

Heatons South

Manor
Patrick McAuley left the Lib Dems in April 2016 to become an Independent politician.

Marple North

Marple South

Offerton

Reddish North

Reddish South

Stepping Hill

Council make up
After the 2015 local election, the  political make up of the council was as follows:

References

2015 English local elections
May 2015 events in the United Kingdom
2015
2010s in Greater Manchester